Girlfriend in a Coma may refer to:

 "Girlfriend in a Coma" (song), a 1987 song by The Smiths
 Girlfriend in a Coma (novel), a 1998 Douglas Coupland novel, named after the song

 Girlfriend in a Coma (film), a 2012 Bill Emmott documentary film